Psychrobacter glaciei is a Gram-negative, non-spore-forming and non-motile bacterium of the genus  Psychrobacter which has been isolated from the ice core of an arctic glacier from Austre Lovénbreen in Svalbard.

References

External links
Type strain of Psychrobacter glaciei at BacDive -  the Bacterial Diversity Metadatabase

Moraxellaceae
Bacteria described in 2016